Bystré is a village and municipality in Vranov nad Topľou District in the Prešov Region of eastern Slovakia.

History
In historical records, the village was first mentioned in 1312. Bystré is also the birthplace of writer, poet and dramaturge Albert Marenčin.

Geography
The municipality lies at an altitude of 175 metres and covers an area of 13.211 km².

Population
According to the 2011 census, the municipality had 2,669 inhabitants. 2,313 of inhabitants were Slovaks, 305 Roma and 51 others and unspecified.

See also
 List of municipalities and towns in Slovakia

References

Genealogical resources

The records for genealogical research are available at the state archive "Statny Archiv in Presov, Slovakia"

 Roman Catholic church records (births/marriages/deaths): 1853-1910 (parish B)
 Greek Catholic church records (births/marriages/deaths): 1803-1942 (parish B)

External links
 
 
https://web.archive.org/web/20071217080336/http://www.statistics.sk/mosmis/eng/run.html
Surnames of living people in Bystre

Villages and municipalities in Vranov nad Topľou District
Šariš